The Women's Liberation Front (WoLF) is an American self-described radical feminist organization that opposes transgender rights and gender identity legislation. It has engaged in litigation on transgender topics, working against the Obama administration's Title IX directives which defined sex discrimination to include gender identity. According to its mission statement, it wishes to “abolish regressive gender roles and the epidemic of male violence using legal arguments, policy advocacy, and public education”. It has been characterized by Vox, The New Republic, and La Presse as a "trans-exclusionary radical feminist" group. WoLF has been described as a hate group.

Structure and ideology
WoLF was founded by author and activist Lierre Keith, who currently serves as its chair. , WoLF had around 1,000 members across the United States.

The Women's Liberation Front's activism finds its source in second-wave feminist tendencies, such as those of Mary Daly and Janice Raymond, which consider transgender identities invalid and say that women are defined by "their biology and by having 'survived girlhood'", rather than by gender identity. While considered a fringe group by the mainstream progressives, who say the group conceals an essentially discriminatory right-wing ideology under the guise of feminism, the organization has found influence through collaboration with conservative groups on shared legislative views.

Though the main focus of WoLF has been on transgender issues, it supports abortion rights, and favors action to combat violence against women and the introduction of the Nordic model approach to prostitution. WoLF is opposed to the Equal Rights Amendment.

Litigation and legal advocacy 
In August 2016, WoLF filed a lawsuit against the Obama administration for its directive on Title IX permitting students to use bathrooms based on their reported gender identity. In their filing, WoLF stated that the Obama administration equated the terms "sex" with "gender identity" without evidence, and that by doing so the administration contradicted the intent of Title IX.

WoLF has filed several amicus curiae briefs to the Supreme Court in opposition to transgender rights. WoLF partnered with the Family Policy Alliance (FPA) to file a joint brief in support of the plaintiff of G. G. v. Gloucester County School Board, opposing a lower court ruling in favor of Gavin Grimm, a transgender male high school student who desired to use the boys' school restroom. The organization also filed a brief in R. G. & G. R. Harris Funeral Homes, Inc., v. Equal Employment Opportunity Commission, a landmark Supreme Court case involving the issue of whether the firing of transgender funeral director Aimee Stephens from Harris Funeral Homes constituted sex discrimination under Title VII of the Civil Rights Act of 1964. WoLF's brief referred to Stephens as a man, and argued that sex should not be considered equivalent to gender identity; WoLF also organized rallies in opposition to Stephens' case outside the Supreme Court in October 2020.

In November 2021, WoLF filed a lawsuit against the California Department of Corrections and Rehabilitation over its policy of permitting transgender, non-binary, and intersex prisoners to be detained in facilities corresponding to their gender identity.

Alignment with conservative organizations 
In 2016, WoLF received a $15,000 donation from the Alliance Defending Freedom (ADF), a conservative Christian organization that opposes abortion and LGBT rights.

In May 2017, WoLF partnered with the Hands Across the Aisle Coalition, Concerned Parents and Educators, and the Family Policy Alliance to submit a petition for rule-making to the U.S. Department of Housing and Urban Development, "to protect the safety and privacy of women in need of shelter due to homelessness or violence".

In 2019, three members of WoLF appeared on a panel with conservative think tank The Heritage Foundation. The panel focused on the Equality Act, legislation pending in Congress that would ban discrimination based on sexual orientation and gender identity. Progressives criticized WoLF's participation in the panel, which included Jennifer Chavez reading "from a letter that described increased transgender visibility and acceptance as 'a social contagion all over the internet.

In June 2022, several groups opposing trans rights, including WoLF, ADF, WDI USA, and Family Research Council, organized a rally called "Our Bodies, Our Sports" in Washington, D. C. Lindsay Schubiner, an expert on right-wing extremism, said the event is part of a larger threat to democracy, and an attempt to legitimize and spread transphobia.

See also
 Feminist views on transgender topics

References

External links
 
 @womenslibfront (user ID 2519109764) on Twitter
 Women's Liberation Front on YouTube
  Brief of Amicus Curiae, Women's Liberation Front in Support of Petitioner, Supreme Court of the United States, August 2019

2013 establishments in the United States
Organizations established in 2013
501(c)(3) organizations
Feminism and transgender
LGBT-related controversies in the United States
Organizations that oppose LGBT rights in the United States
Organizations that oppose transgender rights